Kenosee Lake is a closed-basin lake in the south-east corner of the Canadian province of Saskatchewan. The lake lies in Moose Mountain Provincial Park in the heart of the Moose Mountain Upland, a forested plateau that rises about 200 metres above the surrounding prairie.

The village of Kenosee Lake and the neighbouring Moose Mountain subdivisions are the only places on the lake with a year-round population.

There are three named islands in the lake. The largest is Hog Island. It got its name from when an early pioneering family, the Christophers, kept their hogs on that island to keep them safe from predators, such as wolves. In the 1920s, wolves were hunted to extinction on Moose Mountain. Up until the late 1890s, Manitoba Maples were very common on the upland. Settlers and the local Indians made syrup from the sap of the maples trees. The island right to the south of Hog Island is named Maple Island because of all the syrup producing maple trees. In 1897, a massive fire swept through much of Moose Mountain, destroying most of the maple trees and ending the burgeoning syrup industry. The trees on Maple Island were spared from the fire because of all the water surrounding the island. The third named island is to the south of Maple Island and is called Horseshoe Island. All three islands are on the east side of the lake.

Jutting out from the western shore is a peninsula named Pickerel Point, which forms a large bay at the north-west corner of the lake named Christopher Bay (formally Arcola Bay).

Most of the water that flows into the lake is from rain, ground water, and melting snow. The only large body of water that flows into Kenosee Lake is from Little Kenosee Lake and that flows through Fish Creek at the northern shore.

History 

In the late 1800s, nearby hay farmers, the Weatherald brothers, named the lake Fish Lake. It remained that way until provincial deputy minister John Barnett, upon the opening of Moose Mountain Provincial Park, renamed it Kenosee Lake:

Like many lakes on the prairies, Kenosee Lake does not have an out-flow. The water levels of Kenosee Lake have been monitored periodically over the last 150 years since the first land surveyors came in the 1870s. It has been shown that lake levels have fluctuated greatly in the past. Tree stumps exist today that are rooted lower than any recorded level of the lake. Only once since records have been kept has Kenosee Lake over-flowed its bank and that was in 1928 when it flowed into another closed-basin lake, White Bear (Carlyle) Lake.

Restoration of lake levels 
Beaver are not native to Moose Mountain. In 1923, two breeding pairs from Hudson Bay, Saskatchewan were brought to the lake. One pair was released on the north side and the other pair on the south side. The beavers flourished and soon there were beaver dams on all of the inflows to the lake. This caused the water levels to drop dramatically. In 1954, there were heavy rains but due to the dams, the lake level remained low. The community members asked the government to step in, but nothing was done. The locals then decided to take out four dams on their own. The removal of those four dams increased the level of the lake, but not quite to ideal levels.

According to aerial photographs, the surface of Kenosee Lake was 742 metres asl in 1928. By 1950, it had dropped to 738 metres. With the destruction of the beaver dams in 1954, the lake recovered to 740 metres by 1960. Without further intervention regarding beaver control, by 2008, the lake level had dropped down to 737 metres. It dropped so low that Hog Island, the lake's largest island, was no longer an island.

In 2008, the Moose Mountain Water Resource Management Corp. partnered with Moose Mountain Provincial Park to control beavers through trapping and by blasting beaver dams. They also looked at other ways to control water levels, such as through building culverts and  spillways. Fish Creek, a short creek that flows from Little Kenosee Lake to Kenosee Lake had been blocked when the main road, Highway 209, through the park was built. Part of the water level restoration project was to build culverts to allow the creek to flow again. Between 2008 and 2013, lake water levels rose 9 feet (2.74 m). The corporation and park planned to see a rise of another 9 feet, as that would be enough for Kenosee to overflow its banks and flow into White Bear Lake, which is also well below ideal levels. By 2016, lake levels had stabilised at about 741 metres, just below the level that would see it overflow.

Fish species 
Fish species include walleye, yellow perch, northern pike, and white sucker. The lake is periodically stocked with fish.

Gallery

See also 
List of place names in Canada of Indigenous origin
Tourism in Saskatchewan
Moose Mountain Upland
List of lakes of Saskatchewan

References

External links 

Moose Mountain Provincial Park

Tourism in Saskatchewan
Lakes of Saskatchewan
Wawken No. 93, Saskatchewan
Division No. 1, Saskatchewan
Endorheic lakes of Canada
Kettle lakes in Canada